Protex is a brand of soap marketed by Colgate-Palmolive in 1985. Protex soaps are sold in over 56 countries.  The soap contains an antibacterial chemical called Trichlorocarbanilide.

The brand is distributed by BrandActiv since the late 1980s and is available in all supermarkets and corner shops.

References

Soap brands
Colgate-Palmolive brands
Products introduced in 1985